Hemchandra Baburao Kekre (4 April 1935 – 5 November 2014) was a professor, author, and head of the Computer Science Department at the Indian Institute of Technology Bombay. Kekre was among the initial professors who started the computer science department at IIT Mumbai.

Biography

Early life and education
Hemchandra Kekre was born in India on 4 April 1935 to Mrinalini Kekre, and Baburao Kekre.

Kekre graduated with degrees including: B.E. (Hons) in Telecommunications engineering from Jabalpur Engineering College, MTech in Electrical engineering from the Indian Institute of Technology Bombay, M.S.Engg in (Electrical engineering) from the University of Ottawa, and lastly a PhD in Electrical Engineering from IIT Mumbai.

Kekre moved from the electrical department to the computer science department 1970.  Kekre was head of the Computer Science department between 1978 and 1984. Kekre retired from IIT Mumbai in 1995, and joined Thadomal Shahani Engineering College in Mumbai as a Professor of Computer Science, Vice Principal, and Head of Department of Computer Science. In 2008 Kekre joined Mukesh Patel School of Technology Management & Engineering (MPSTME) as a Senior Professor of Computer Science. Kekre worked in MPSTME until his death.

Academic works
Kekre is named after several transformations, these include: Kekre wavelet transform,
 Kekre's hybrid wavelet transform technique, Kekre's fast codebook generation and Kekre's LUV color space.

References

1935 births
2014 deaths
IIT Bombay alumni